Braathens Regional Aviation was a Norwegian-owned Swedish airline headquartered in Malmö operating aircraft wet-leasing services together with its sister airline Braathens Regional Airways for BRA Braathens Regional Airlines. 

Previously it was known under the name Malmö Aviation and operated domestic routes in Sweden from its hub at Stockholm-Bromma Airport until February 2016, when its operations merged with Sverigeflyg to form BRA Braathens Regional Airlines. In the process the airline changed its name to the current Braathens Regional Aviation and ceased its own network-operations.

History 
The company was established in 1981, operating as a flight training school and air charter company. In the late 1980s it began operating cargo services on behalf of TNT with BAe 146-200QT jet aircraft; and examples of the turboprop Fokker F27 Friendship and its derivatives the Fairchild F-27 and Fairchild Hiller FH-227.

The company was sold to City Air Scandinavia on 11 February 1992. A new company Malmö Aviation Schedule was formed on 16 April 1993 under the ownership of Wiklund Inter Trade. Braathens of Norway acquired full control in August 1998 and in early 1999 integrated Braathens Sweden (formerly Transwede) into Malmö Aviation. In December 2001 it became an independent airline owned by Braganza AS/Bramora. This was the result of the Scandinavian Airlines (SAS) acquisition of Braathens in which Malmö Aviation, for legal reasons, was not included. It is now wholly owned by Braathens Aviation.

In September 2014, Malmö Aviation stated that it would no longer be the Bombardier CS100's launch customer as previously planned. This role has since been taken over by Swiss Global Air Lines.

In March 2016, the operational part of Malmö Aviation was merged into BRA Braathens Regional Airlines together with Sverigeflyg and the name was changed to Braathens Regional Aviation.

In March 2017, Braathens Regional Aviation announced the postponement all of its orders for the Airbus A220, then known as Bombardier C-Series, indefinitely after a new Swedish ticket tax will be introduced which is expected to reduce passenger numbers. In May 2019, Braathens announced the cancellation of their A220-order which consisted of five -100 and five -300 series aircraft.

In 2020, the airline ceased all operations. Its similar named sister companies Braathens Regional Airlines and Braathens Regional Airways continue to operate.

Destinations 
Braathens Regional Aviation did not operate flights under its own name. Instead the aircraft were used to operate flights for sister airline BRA Braathens Regional Airlines.

Fleet

As of March 2020, the Braathens Regional Aviation fleet consisted of the following aircraft, which were all operated for BRA Braathens Regional Airlines:

See also
 Airlines
 Transport in Sweden

References

Citations

Bibliography

External links

 

Defunct airlines of Sweden
Airlines established in 1981
Airlines disestablished in 2020
Transport in Malmö
Swedish companies established in 1981

Companies based in Malmö